Jules Philippin (18 June 1818, in Le Locle – 15 December 1882) was a Swiss politician and President of the Swiss National Council (1866/1867 and 1878).

External links 
 
 

1818 births
1882 deaths
People from Le Locle
Swiss Calvinist and Reformed Christians
Free Democratic Party of Switzerland politicians
Members of the Council of States (Switzerland)
Members of the National Council (Switzerland)
Presidents of the National Council (Switzerland)
Swiss military officers